The Grave may refer to:
The Grave (TV series), an Israeli science fiction TV show.
"The Grave" (The Twilight Zone), a 1961 episode of The Twilight Zone
The Grave (1996 film), a thriller film
The Grave (2020 film), a film by Gazi Rakayet
The Grave (play), a play by Munier Choudhury
The Grave (poem), a poem by Scottish poet Robert Blair
The Grave (novel), a 1997 novel by James Heneghan
"The Grave", a song from Don McLean's album American Pie

See also
 Grave (disambiguation)
 Graves (disambiguation)
 The Graves (disambiguation)